The Cruising Yacht Club of Australia (CYCA) was established in 1944 in Darling Point, inner-east Sydney. The club is known as one of Australia's premier yacht clubs, and is acknowledged as one of the leaders in ocean racing in the country. The club hosts the annual Rolex Sydney to Hobart Yacht Race.

In 2019, the CYCA celebrated the 75th anniversary of both the club and the race to Hobart, with celebrations of the event.

In October 2018, the Club finished a major makeover to its Darling Point premises, with the clubhouse renovated.

Facilities
CYCA facilities include a marina on Rushcutters Bay capable of berthing yachts up to 30 metres in length and five-star function rooms and restaurants. It currently has a membership of 3,000.

Board of Directors
As of 2022–2023:
Commodore – Arthur Lane
 Vice-Commodore – Dr Sam Haynes
 Rear-Commodores – Tom Barker & Peter Gothard
 Treasurer – David Jacobs
 Directors – David Griffith, Jackie Sapir, Jules Hall & Kevin Whelan

References

Further reading

External links

 Cruising Yacht Club of Australia
 Rolex Sydney-to-Hobart Yacht Race
 2005 Sydney-to-Hobart Media Information

Yacht clubs in New South Wales
Sydney to Hobart Yacht Race
Marinas in Australia
1944 establishments in Australia
Sports clubs established in 1944
Sporting clubs in Sydney
Rushcutters Bay, New South Wales